Miwa Morikawa is a Japanese freestyle wrestler. She won the gold medal in the 65kg event at the 2022 World Wrestling Championships held in Belgrade, Serbia. She won the silver medal in the women's 65 kg event at the 2021 World Wrestling Championships held in Oslo, Norway.

In 2018, she won the silver medal in the women's 65 kg event at the Klippan Lady Open in Klippan, Sweden.

She won the gold medal in her event at the 2022 Asian Wrestling Championships held in Ulaanbaatar, Mongolia. She also won the gold medal in her event at the 2022 U23 World Wrestling Championships held in Pontevedra, Spain.

Achievements

References

External links

 

Living people
Year of birth missing (living people)
Place of birth missing (living people)
Japanese female sport wrestlers
World Wrestling Championships medalists
Asian Wrestling Championships medalists
21st-century Japanese women
World Wrestling Champions